Murat Han (born 1 May 1975) is a Turkish-American stage and film actor.  He is best known for Bliss, Vicdan, Ömre bedel, Sensiz Olmaz and Thophy.

Biography 

Murat Han is an Ankara-born film and television actor. He attended Bilkent University. 
He earned a BA in theater arts in Turkey and relocated to Los Angeles in 1998 to continue acting studies at the Stella Adler Academy for the next two years. Han also joined many acting workshops, benefiting from work with Charles Waxberg on script analysis for performers. He has been acting in leading roles in Turkish TV series and movies distributed widely in the Middle East and East Europe. He currently lives in Los Angeles and is working on new projects.

Film and television
 Vazgeç Gönlüm (2007–2008) as Salih
 Bliss (2007) as Cemal; 44th Antalya Golden Orange Film Festival - best actor
 Vicdan (2008) as Mahmut
 Ömre Bedel (2009) as Cesur
 Hesaplaşma (2009)
 Sensiz Olmaz (2011) as Hakan
 Thophy (2011) as Ivan
 Eve Düşen Yıldırım (2012) as Namik 
 Sana Bir Sır Vereceğim (2013–2014) as Mehmet
 Hatasız Kul Olmaz (2014) as Bulut
 Kervan 1915 (2016) as Salim
 Evlat Kokusu (2017) as Cevahir Akbaş
 Savaşçı (2018–2019) as Karon
 Akif (2020) as Ali Şükrü Bey
 Yalnız Kurt (2022) as Doğan Sakınmaz
 Prestij Meselesi (2023) as Eşref

References

External links

1975 births
Living people
People from Üsküdar
Male actors from Ankara
21st-century Turkish male actors
Turkish male film actors
Turkish male television actors
American people of Turkish descent